Fasli Calendar or Fasli era, Fasli (English: meaning Harvest) is a harvest-based calendar system that was used across South Asia, but today, is mainly used in Deccan. It was the official calendar of Hyderabad Deccan.

The Deccani Fasli calendar begins in October, marking the first of Azur.

Fasli year means period of 12 months from July to June. Adding 590 to Fasli year comes to Gregorian calendar, corresponding Gregorian year for Fasli year 1410 was from July 2000-June 2001.

Formation

The calendar formation year is considered as 963 Hijra (A. H.) in the Islamic calendar. From that year onward, the fasli calendar has been a solar year. The name and number of the Days and the Months are same as Islamic calendar. The first day of the year is 7 or 8 June.

The Fasli calendar dated from the accession year of Akbar. Thus the beginning of Fasli era is equal to below calendars.
 963 AH (Islamic calendar)
 1556 AD (Julian calendar)
 1612 SE (Hindu Samavat Calendar)

History

Fasli Calendar is a chronological system introduced by the Mughal emperor Akbar basically for land revenue and records purposes in northern India, The differences in records dates due to the Muslim lunar calendar because of moon sighting have led him to introduce an alternate calendar which follows simultaneously with Islamic Lunar calendar and Hindu Samavat solar Calendar. Which can give the fix dating system.

Akbar insistence to equalize the Fasli calendar according to Islamic calendar accordingly with Hindu calendar, thus he took 649 years from the Hindu calendar year in order to make the Fasli year 963. Since then, the Fasli calendar proceeded according to the Hindu calendar.

Introduction in Deccan

Shah Jahan the grandson of Akbar, introduced the Fasli Calendar to Deccan Suba (South India) in 1630 AD, which continued as an official calendar of Asaf Jahi rulers of the Hyderabad State, until last Nizam, Mir Osman Ali Khan acceded the Hyderabad State to the Indian Union.

Current status

After the accession of the Hyderabad State, the Nizam continued as the Rajpramukh (princely Head of State) and used to follow the Fasli calendar in his official sanctions and records. Currently Andhra Pradesh State Wakf Board, Nizam Trust follows Fasli calendar simultaneously with Gregorian calendar and Islamic calendar to maintain records. The Andhra Pradesh Government, Karnataka Government and the Tamil Nadu Government still use Fasli year in all of their revenue and judiciary purposes.

References

External links
 Faṣlī era: Encyclopædia Britannica

1650 establishments in Asia
Gregorian calendar
Calendars
Calendar eras
Hindu calendar
Islamic calendar
Mughal culture
Time in India
Hyderabad State